Tümay Ertek was born in Silifke, Mersin, Turkey, in 1938. He received his high school degree from Tarsus American College in 1958 and his bachelor's degree from Middle East Technical University (METU) in 1962. He received his master and Ph.D. from University of Wisconsin–Madison, Wisconsin, United States. He served as a professor at Middle East Technical University (METU) and then Boğaziçi University for many years. During 1971–1972, he also served as the Head of Department at the Economics Department at Middle East Technical University (METU). In the meanwhile, he visited Khartoum University in Sudan, Pahlavi University in Iran, and Boise State University in Idaho, United States, as a visiting professor.

Ertek became Associate Professor in 1981, full Professor in 1988, and retired from Boğaziçi University in 1995. Following his retirement, Ertek served at Eastern Mediterranean University in the Turkish Republic of Cyprus, and then at various private universities in Turkey.

Ertek died in 2011. In his final years, he contributed to the development of the field of economics in Turkey by doing research regarding the Turkish economy and writing numerous textbooks for university students.

Books
 "Meslek Yüksekokulları için Makro İktisat by Tümay Ertek (Beta Yayıncılık, 2012)
 "Meslek Yüksekokulları için İktisata Giriş by Tümay Ertek (Beta Yayıncılık, 2012)
 "Temel Ekonomi by Tümay Ertek (Beta Yayıncılık, 2011)
 "Temel Ekonomi için Alıştırmalar by Tümay Ertek (Beta Yayıncılık, 2011)
 "Mikroekonomi Teorisi by Tümay Ertek (Beta Yayıncılık, 2009)
 "Mikroekonomi Teorisi için Alıştırmalar by Tümay Ertek (Beta Yayıncılık, 2010)
 "Makroekonomiye Giriş by Tümay Ertek (Beta Yayıncılık, 2005)
 "Mikroekonomiye Giriş by Tümay Ertek (Beta Yayıncılık, 2012)

Notes

External links

 Prof. Tümay Ertek's home page (in Turkish)

1938 births
2011 deaths
Middle East Technical University alumni
University of Wisconsin–Madison alumni